Eloína C. Echevarría (born August 23, 1961) is a retired Cuban long jumper and triple jumper.

Her personal best jumps were 6.59 metres in the long jump, achieved in February 1979 in Havana; and 14.34 in the triple jump, achieved in February 1995 in Havana.

Achievements

1Representing the Americas

External links
 

1961 births
Living people
Cuban people of Basque descent
Cuban female long jumpers
Cuban female triple jumpers
Pan American Games medalists in athletics (track and field)
Pan American Games silver medalists for Cuba
Pan American Games bronze medalists for Cuba
Athletes (track and field) at the 1979 Pan American Games
Athletes (track and field) at the 1983 Pan American Games
Athletes (track and field) at the 1987 Pan American Games
Athletes (track and field) at the 1991 Pan American Games
Central American and Caribbean Games gold medalists for Cuba
Competitors at the 1978 Central American and Caribbean Games
Competitors at the 1982 Central American and Caribbean Games
Competitors at the 1986 Central American and Caribbean Games
Competitors at the 1990 Central American and Caribbean Games
Competitors at the 1993 Central American and Caribbean Games
Central American and Caribbean Games medalists in athletics
Medalists at the 1979 Pan American Games
Medalists at the 1983 Pan American Games
Medalists at the 1987 Pan American Games
Medalists at the 1991 Pan American Games
20th-century Cuban women
20th-century Cuban people